Laura Grant (born 25 April 2001) is a Scottish cricketer. In July 2018, she was named in Scotland's squad for the 2018 ICC Women's World Twenty20 Qualifier tournament. She made her Women's Twenty20 International (WT20I) debut for Scotland against Uganda in the World Twenty20 Qualifier on 7 July 2018.

References

External links
 

2001 births
Living people
Scottish women cricketers
Scotland women Twenty20 International cricketers
Place of birth missing (living people)